Orville Zimmerman (December 31, 1880 – April 7, 1948) was a U.S. Representative from Missouri.

Born on a farm near Glenallen in Bollinger County, Missouri, Zimmerman attended the public schools and Mayfield-Smith Academy in Marble Hill, Missouri. He graduated from Southeast Missouri State College in Cape Girardeau in 1904 and was principal of Dexter High School from 1904 to 1908. He then graduated from the law department of the University of Missouri at Columbia in 1911, was admitted to the bar the same year and commenced practice in Kennett, Missouri.

During World War I, Zimmerman served as a private in the United States Army in 1918. He was a member of the board of education of Kennett from 1928 to 1936 and a member of the board of regents of Southeast Missouri State College from 1933 to 1948. Zimmerman was elected a Democrat to the U.S. House of Representatives in 1934 and was re-elected six additional times until his death on April 7, 1948, in Washington, D.C. He is interred at Oak Ridge Cemetery in Kennett, Missouri.

See also
 List of members of the American Legion
 List of United States Congress members who died in office (1900–49)

References

 

1880 births
1948 deaths
20th-century American politicians
United States Army personnel of World War I
Military personnel from Missouri
Missouri lawyers
People from Bollinger County, Missouri
People from Dexter, Missouri
People from Kennett, Missouri
School board members in Missouri
American school principals
Southeast Missouri State University alumni
United States Army soldiers
University of Missouri School of Law alumni
Democratic Party members of the United States House of Representatives from Missouri
20th-century American lawyers